Özvatan (formerly Çukur and Sirixa (Ancient Greek: Σάριχα ή Σιριχά) is a town and district of Kayseri Province in the Central Anatolia region of Turkey. This is a tiny district of Kayseri. It is located in the north east of the province and it is almost 70 km from Kayseri. It is connected to the town 'Felahiye'. It has a harsh climate being too cold in winter and too hot in summer. It has a population of approximately 9,500. The mayor is Nihat Çiftçi (AKP).

History 
The oldest ruins in the district are the Harsa and Zırha Castles, which are located on the side of Kızilirmak and are thought to belong to Hittites. It is known that mining and trade were engaged in the region during the Hittites period. Around 430 BC, Zırha Castle was added to the territory of Rome, so it is possible to come across traces of Roman Civilization in the region.

References

Populated places in Kayseri Province
Districts of Kayseri Province
Towns in Turkey